Anna Rawson (born 5 August 1981) is an Australian model and former professional golfer. She played on the Ladies European Tour and the LPGA Tour.

Amateur and modeling career
Rawson was born in Adelaide, Australia. She got her break into a modeling career at age 16, when she was a finalist in the Australian "Dolly" Magazine cover contest. This opened up modeling opportunities on the catwalk, in print ads, magazines, and on television. In 1999 as an amateur golfer in Australia, Rawson was the South Australian and Victoria Junior Champion plus the winner of the Jack Newton International Junior Classic. She was the leading qualifier for the 1999 and 2000 Australian Women's Amateur and was a member of the 1999 Australian National Squad.

She played collegiate golf at the University of Southern California.  She was named All-Pac-10 honorable mention in 2001, 2002 and 2004.

She also went to Immanuel College in Novar Gardens, South Australia and has a Master of Business Administration degree from Columbia Business School which she obtained in May 2015.

Professional career
Rawson turned professional at the end of 2004, played a full season on the Future Tour and missed the cut at the 2004 LPGA Final Qualifying Tournament. She finished third at the Ladies European Tour 2005 qualifying tournament and was a season 2006 LET rookie. On 5 December 2007, Rawson notified fans via her Myspace page that she had been invited to join the LPGA Tour. In 2008, she qualified for a full-time tour card via Q school for the 2009 tour.

Results in LPGA majors

CUT = missed the half-way cut
WD = withdrew
"T" = tied

LPGA Tour career summary

Official as of 31 January 2011

References

External links

Feature on thegolfmap.com/blog
Feature at OntGolf.ca

Australian female golfers
USC Trojans women's golfers
Ladies European Tour golfers
LPGA Tour golfers
People educated at Immanuel College, Adelaide
1981 births
Living people